The Oratory of the Rosary of Saint Dominic (Italian: Oratorio del Rosario di San Domenico) is a Baroque oratory of Palermo. It is located near the Church of Saint Dominic, in the quarter of the Loggia, within the historic centre of Palermo.

The oratory was founded in 1574. In the early 18th century Giacomo Serpotta realized a sumptuous stucco decoration. Moreover, the oratory is decorated with several paintings of important artists like Matthias Stom; Guglielmo Borremans; Geronimo Gerardi (a Nativity); Pietro Novelli; Valerio Castello; and Luca Giordano. 

The most prominent painting is the main altarpiece by Anthony van Dyck, depicting the Madonna of the Rosary with the saints Dominic, Catherine of Siena, Vincent Ferrer, Olivia, Nympha, Agatha, Christina and Rosalia. The painting was commissioned to Van Dyck during the period of the 1624 plague.

External links 

 Gaspare Palermo, Guida istruttiva per potersi conoscere tutte le magnificenze della Città di Palermo, Volume I, Palermo, Reale Stamperia, 1816

 Rosario Domenico
Baroque architecture in Palermo
16th-century Roman Catholic church buildings in Italy